The 1897 Rush Medical football team was an American football team that represented Rush Medical College in the 1897 college football season. The medics compiled a 1–4–2 record, and were outscored by their opponents 62 to 14.

Schedule

References

Rush Medical
Rush Medical College football seasons
Rush Medical football